Ann Ormonde (born 20 January 1935) is a former Irish Fianna Fáil politician and was a member of Seanad Éireann from 1993 to 2011. She was elected by the Cultural and Educational Panel. She was first elected to the Seanad in 1992 and re-elected at every subsequent election until she lost her seat at the 2011 election.

Born in Kilmacthomas, County Waterford, she was educated at the Presentation Convent, Clonmel and University College Dublin. She is a former Career Guidance Counsellor.

She served as a member of South Dublin County Council for the Terenure / Rathfarnham from 1985 to 2004. She was an unsuccessful candidate for the Dáil in the Dublin South constituency at the 1987, 1989, 1992 and 1997 general elections.

References

1935 births
Living people
Alumni of University College Dublin
Councillors of Dublin County Council
Fianna Fáil senators
Local councillors in South Dublin (county)
Members of the 20th Seanad
Members of the 21st Seanad
Members of the 22nd Seanad
Members of the 23rd Seanad
20th-century women members of Seanad Éireann
21st-century women members of Seanad Éireann
Politicians from County Waterford